The 1969–70 FC Bayern Munich season was the club's fifth season in Bundesliga.

Team kit

Review and events
The club could not defend the championship in this season. Furthermore, Bayern was defeated in the first round of the European Cup and in the quarterfinals of the cup by Saint Étienne and 1. FC Nürnberg respectively. The season was overshadowed by a very harsh winter, therefore games had to be postponed because of frozen pitches between January and April 1970.

Match results

Legend

Bundesliga

League fixtures and results

League standings

DFB-Pokal

European Cup

References

FC Bayern Munich seasons
Bayern